Thomas Wayne Brown (born July 8, 1957) is a former American football defensive lineman who played for three seasons in the National Football League. He played college football at Baylor before he was drafted by the Philadelphia Eagles in the eleventh round of the 1980 NFL Draft. He played for one season for the Eagles (1980) and two seasons for the Cleveland Browns (1981 and 1983).

Professional career
Brown was selected by the Philadelphia Eagles in the eleventh round (302nd overall) of the 1980 NFL Draft. After the 1980 season, Brown was traded to the Cleveland Browns in exchange for a seventh round selection in the 1983 NFL Draft on August 24, 1981. The Eagles used the seventh-round pick on offensive guard Jon Schultheis in 1983. Brown played for the Browns in 1981 and 1983.

References

1957 births
Living people
Sportspeople from Galveston, Texas
Players of American football from Texas
American football defensive ends
American football linebackers
Baylor Bears football players
Philadelphia Eagles players
Cleveland Browns players